In Islam,  (  , plural:    ) is a prayer of invocation, supplication or request, even asking help or assistance from God.

Role in Islam

Muslims regard this as a profound act of worship. Muhammad is reported to have said, "Dua is itself a worship."

There is a special emphasis on du'a in Muslim spirituality and early Muslims took great care to record the supplications of Muhammad and his family and transmit them to subsequent generations. These traditions precipitated new genres of literature in which prophetic supplications were gathered together in single volumes that were memorized and taught. Collections such as al-Nawawi's Kitab al-Adhkar and Shams al-Din al-Jazari's al-Hisn al-Hasin exemplify this literary trend and gained significant currency among Muslim devotees keen to learn how Muhammad supplicated to God.

However, Du'a literature is not restricted to prophetic supplications; many later Muslim scholars and sages composed their own supplications, often in elaborate rhyming prose that would be recited by their disciples. Popular du'as would include Muhammad al-Jazuli's Dala'il al-Khayrat, which at its peak spread throughout the Muslim world, and Abul Hasan ash-Shadhili's Hizb al-Bahr which also had widespread appeal. Du'a literature reaches its most lyrical form in the Munajat, or 'whispered intimate prayers' such as those of Ibn Ata Allah. Among the Shia schools, the Al-Sahifa al-Sajjadiyya records du'as attributed to Ali and his grandson, Ali ibn Husayn Zayn al-Abidin.

Types and categories 

Dua is essentially an expression of submission of faith to God and of one's neediness.

Type I: Du'ā al-mas'alah (دُعَاءُ الْمَسْأَلَة du‘ā’u ’l-mas‘alah), or the 'du'a of asking.' This type of du'a is when one asks for the fulfillment of a need, or that some harm be removed from him/her. An example would be when a person asks, "O God! Grant me good in this world, and good in the next life!"

Type II: Du'ā al-'ibadah (دُعَاءُ الْعِبَادَة du‘ā’u ’l-‘ibādah), or the 'du'a of worship.' This type of du'a includes every single act of worship. Examples would include when a Muslim prays or gives zakāt or fasts.

Salat 

The salat is the obligatory prayer recited five times a day, as described in the Quran: "And establish regular prayers at the two ends of the day and at the approaches of the night: For those things, that are good remove those that are evil: Be that the word of remembrance to those who remember (their Lord):"[Quran 11:114] Salat is generally read in the Arabic language; however Imam Abu Hanifah, for whom the Hanafi school is named after, proclaimed that prayer could be said in any language unconditionally. His two students who created the school: Abu Yusuf and Muhammad al-Shaybani, however, did not agree and believed that prayers could only be done in languages other than Arabic if the supplicant can not speak Arabic. Some traditions hold that Abu Hanifa later agreed with them and changed his decision; however there has never been any evidence of this. Hanbali theologian Ibn Taymiyah issued a fatwa proclaiming the same. Until the 1950s, Ismailis from India and Pakistan performed the prayer the language of the local Jama'at Khana.

Common duas 

A person recites Surah Ya Sin early in the morning then his need for the day will be fulfilled.
Abdullah bin Masood narrates that Muhammad has stated that the person who recites the last two ayat of Surah Al-Baqara till the end, then these two ayats will be sufficient for him, i.e. God will protect him from all evil and ploys.
When retiring to sleep, make wudu, dust off the bed three times, lie on the right side, place the right hand under the head or cheeks and recite the following dua three times:  ("In your name, O Allah, I die and I live")
A person who recites three times  ("I seek refuge in Allah, the All-Hearing and All Knowing from the accursed devil") in the morning the last three ayat of Surah Al-Hashr then God delegates 70,000 angels (malāʾikah) to send mercy onto him till the evening and if he dies that day, he will die as a martyr and if he recites these in the evening then God delegates 70,000 angels to send mercy onto him till the morning and if he dies that night, he dies as a martyr.
A Muslim servant recites  ("I am pleased with Allah as my Lord, and with Islam as my religion, and with Muhammad as my Prophet") three times every morning, then it becomes the responsibility of God to satisfy him on the Day of Qiyamah.
A person who has recited  ("O God, whatever favour has come to me or to any of Thy creatures in the morning, it comes from Thee alone who hast no partner, to whom be praise and thanksgiving") in the morning, he has pleased (praised, glorified) God for His favours of the morning, and if he has done so in the night, he has thanked God for His favours of the night.
If a person recites three ayat of Surah Ar-Rum and if he misses his normal recitation of the day, he will still be rewarded for it. This applies to the night as well.
If a person retires to bed on the side and recites Surah Al-Fatiha and Surah Al-Ikhlas he is immune from everything besides death.
 Reciting Ayat-ul Kursi will cause the reciter to be protected throughout the night by the angels and Satan will not come near him.
 When a person enters his bed (to sleep), an angel and a Shaitan surround him. The Shaitan whispers 'your awakening will end in evil' and the angel says' end in good". One sleeps after engaging in dhikr, the angels will protect him throughout the night. In order to gain the protection of the angels, it is encouraged to engage in dhikr and then sleep.
 A man dreamed of Muhammad several times. Each time he asked Muhammed for advice on being able to retain his faith. He was told by Muhammad to recite the following each day:

Zayn al-'Abidin's Dua 
Ali ibn al-Husayn Zayn al-'Abidin conveyed his understanding of the relationship between human and God by the prayers and supplications that he offered God during his extensive nighttime vigils in the Al-Masjid an-Nabawi (Mosque of the Prophet) in Medina. These prayers and supplications were written down and then disseminated by his sons and the subsequent generations. Among them is the Al-Sahifa al-Sajjadiyya, which is known as the Psalms of the Household of Muhammad.

The pre-conditions 
In Islam there are nine pre-conditions that need to be present in order for a du'a to be accepted.

Sincerity 
In Islam, rules have been made to remember Allah. All Muslims follow those rules.
It is necessary to be pure in order to remember God in Islam. 
Every Muslim is required to offer prayers for 5 times, Allah is remembered through prayers. In Islam a Muslim prays to God alone.

Patience 
In Islam, to be hasty in du'a is said to be a cause of rejection of du'a. The type of hastiness that is forbidden in Islam is that a person leaves du'a, thinking that God will not respond to it. In Islam, Muslims are instructed not to give up du'a because they do not see a response immediately.

Purity 
In Islam, in order for a person's du'a to be accepted by God, it must be for something pure and reasonable.

Good intentions 
In Islam it is imperative that a person making du'a have the best of intentions for whatever he or she is asking. An example would be if someone asks for an increase in wealth, they should intend with that increase in wealth to spend more on the poor and on their relatives.

Attentive heart 
A Muslim is instructed to make du'a with an attentive heart. A Muslim should be aware of what he is saying and should believe in his or her heart that their du'a will be responded to by God.

Sustenance 
It states in the Quran in sura Al-Baqara Verse 200:

Again and moreover Muhammad is reported to have said,

Why Duas are not answered 

Muslims scholars had made a number of explanations for why Du'as are sometimes not accepted.

Authentic or confirmed reasons

Impatience 
God rejects supplications if the worshipper is hasty or does not have patience.

Not praising God and the Messenger of Allah
One reported Hadith relates as follows,

If worshipper thinks Dua will not be answered 
Muhammad is reported to have said,

Not thinking positively of God may have invocations unanswered. Muhammad said:

Sinful or haraam income and food 
Muhammad made mention of a person who travels widely, his hair dishevelled, and covered with dust.

A similar version in Hadith reported by Ahmad, Muslim, and al-Tirmidhi from Abu Hurayrah, as mentioned in sahih al-Jami #2744.

Asking for something sinful 
Abu Hurayrah reports that Muhammad said:

Cutting of the ties of kinship 

Muhammad said:

Making Dua conditional 
Muhammad said:

In Shia Islam

Praying or Du'a in Shia has an important place as Muhammad described it as a weapon of the believer. Du'a is considered a feature of Shia community in a sense.  Performing Du'a in Shia has a special ritual. Because of this, there are many books written on the conditions of praying among Shia. Most of ad'ayieh transferred from the household of Muhammad and then by many books in which we can observe teachings of Muhammad and his household according to Shia. The leaderships of Shia always invited their followers to recite Du'a. For instance, Ali has considered with the subject of Du'a because of his leadership in monotheism.
Shia believe that Dua is possible both in terms of philosophy and from other religion. Some philosophers likes Avicenna, however refers to the importance and possibility but reality of dua. He says that if one heard that someone got health by the Mystic or some problem has been resolved by Bua then do not deny them without reflection suddenly since that may there is a wisdom and mystery. Certainly mystic is one who has connection with Trans physic. Therefore, no one of Islamic sages denied the affection of dua.

Among believers there are three groups on Dua. One group is radical such a way that they believe that there is no role for dua in life of believer. Second group believe that at least some of Dua are of affection but many of them don't have any affection. Third group are of moderate attitude on Dua. They believe that Dua is of condition and there are preliminaries for fulfillment of Dua.
According to Mutahhari, Dua is both premises and conclusion, both means and end. Mutahhari knows Dua as disposition and innate desire within human.

Other optional etiquette 
There are various other optional techniques and etiquettes in the Quran and Sunnah for Du'a. Listed here are a limited few and just a fraction of the etiquettes of du'a that scholars have found in reference to in the Quran and Sunnah.

Raising one's hands 

Raising one's hands is an encouraged option. There are many hadith that describe how Muhammad raised his hands during du'a. Some hadith describe him having raised his hands to or above head-level in dire circumstances. Many scholars agree that aside from times of exceptionally great need, Muhammad did not raise his hands above his head. Under any other conditions, a common practice is to raise the hands to shoulder-height with palms placed together.

Scholars however agree that there are two authentic ways of raising one's hands: when not in drastic conditions the palms of one's hands should be turned up facing the skies, whilst the back of one's hands are facing the ground, then the du'a can be "recited". One must also make sure to face the Qibla (direction of prayer), whilst making du'a.

The second way agreed upon by scholars is to have the palms facing one's face; once again one must face the Qibla, but this time the back of one's hands should also face the Qibla.

Evidence for facing the Qibla during du'a can be found in Sahih al-Bukhari and Sahih Muslim

Abdullah ibn Zayd narrated:

Facing the Qiblah 

The Qibla is the direction that Muslims face while performing salat.

There are also Sahih hadith which narrate that it is forbidden to lift one's eyes towards the sky in prayer.

Abu Huraira reported:

Wiping the face 
Once the du'a has been completed, it is most common for the supplicant to wipe their face with their hands, and this act signals the end of the du'a.

See also 
 Raising hands in Dua
 Du'a Kumayl
 Duha
 Mafatih al-Janan
 The Sermon for Necessities- a popular sermon in the Islamic world, particularly as the introduction to a khutbah during Jumu'ah
 Durood
 Dua in Yazidism

References

External links 

Islamic terminology
Salah
Salah terminology